Dobele Municipality is a municipality in the historical region of Zemgale, and the Zemgale Planning Region in Latvia. The municipality was formed in 2009 by merging Dobele town and the Annenieki, Auri, Bērze, Biksti, Dobele, Jaunbērze, Krimūna, Naudīte, Penkule and Zebrene parishes, the administrative centre being Dobele. As of 2020, the population was 19,286.

On 1 July 2021, Dobele Municipality was enlarged when Auce Municipality and Tērvete Municipality were merged into it.

Twin towns — sister cities

Dobele is twinned with:

 Akmenė, Lithuania
 Ängelholm, Sweden
 Joniškis, Lithuania
 Konin, Poland
 Schmölln, Germany

Images

See also
 Administrative divisions of Latvia

References

 
Municipalities of Latvia
Semigallia